Warsaw Department (Polish: Departament warszawski) was a unit of administrative division and local government in the Duchy of Warsaw in years 1806–1815. Its capital was Warsaw.

Administrative division: 10 counties

Błonie County
Brzezin County
Czersk County
Gostynin County
Łęczyca County
Orłów County
Rawa Mazowiecka County
Sochaczew County
Warszawa County
Zgiersk County
Siennick County (1810)
Stanisławow County (1810)

In 1815 it was transformed into Masovian Voivodeship.

References

 Jacek Arkadiusz Goclon, Polska na królu pruskim zdobyta, Wydawnictwo Uniwersytetu Wrocławskiego, Wrocław 2002.
 Mieczysław Bandurka, Zmiany administracyjne i terytorialne ziem województwa łódzkiego w XIX i XX wieku, NDAP, UW w Łodzi, AP w Łodzi, Łódź 1995.
 

Departments of the Duchy of Warsaw
History of Warsaw